In neuroanatomy, the paracentral lobule is on the medial surface of the cerebral hemisphere and is the continuation of the precentral and postcentral gyri. The paracentral lobule controls motor and sensory innervations of the contralateral lower extremity. It is also responsible for control of defecation and urination.
 
It includes portions of the frontal and parietal lobes:
 The anterior portion of the paracentral lobule is part of the frontal lobe and contains a little portion of Brodmann's area 6 (SMA): this is because the paracentral sulcus (branch of the limbic sulcus) does not correspond to the precentral sulcus on the medial plane. 
 The posterior portion is considered part of the parietal lobe and deals with somatosensory of the distal limbs.

While the boundary between the lobes, the central sulcus, is easy to locate on the lateral surface of the cerebral hemispheres, this boundary is often discerned in a cytoarchetectonic manner in cases where the central sulcus is not visible on the medial surface.

Function
Neurons in paracentral lobule are concerned with:
 Motor and sensory innervations of the contralateral lower extremity
 Regulation of physiological function such as defecation and micturition

Blood supply
It is supplied by branches of the anterior cerebral artery.

Applied anatomy
Damage of paracentral lobule occurs from occlusion of anterior cerebral artery. Characteristic manifestations include:
 Contralateral lower limb muscle weakness           
 Urinary incontinence

Gallery

References

External links

 https://web.archive.org/web/20090405083407/http://psychology.uwo.ca/fmri4newbies/PrimeronCorticalSulci.html#Cingulate%20sulcus

Gyri
Frontal lobe
Parietal lobe
Medial surface of cerebral hemisphere